The Division of Melbourne is an Australian electoral division in the State of Victoria, represented since the 2010 election by Adam Bandt, leader of the Australian Greens.

The division was proclaimed in 1900, and was one of the original 65 divisions to be contested at the first federal election. The Division of Melbourne encompasses the City of Melbourne and the suburbs of Abbotsford, Burnley, Carlton, Carlton North, Clifton Hill, Collingwood, Cremorne, Docklands, East Melbourne, Fitzroy, Fitzroy North, North Melbourne, Parkville, Princes Hill, Richmond, West Melbourne and parts of Brunswick East. The area has heavy and light engineering, extensive manufacturing, commercial and retail activities (including Melbourne markets and central business district), dockyards, clothing and footwear industries, warehousing and distributing of whitegoods, building and other general goods. This capital city electorate's northern boundary is formed by Maribyrnong Road, Ormond Road, Park Street, Sydney Road and Glenlyon Road between the Yarra River, Maribyrnong River and Merri Creek. The division also contains the main Parkville Campus of the University of Melbourne.

Melbourne has the highest proportion of Greens first party preferences relative to any other federal division. Melbourne also has a higher than average university education rate, with 44.8% of electors holding a bachelor's degree or above.

Geography
Since 1984, federal electoral division boundaries in Australia have been determined at redistributions by a redistribution committee appointed by the Australian Electoral Commission. Redistributions occur for the boundaries of divisions in a particular state, and they occur every seven years, or sooner if a state's representation entitlement changes or when divisions of a state are malapportioned.

History

Melbourne was held by the Australian Labor Party for the better part of its history. Labor first won the seat at a 1904 by-election, and held it for over a century, with former Opposition Leader Arthur Calwell the highest profile member. For most of the time from 1907 to 2004, it was one of Labor's safest seats. During this time, Labor's hold on the seat was only remotely threatened once, when Calwell saw his majority trimmed to 57.2 percent amidst the Coalition's landslide victory in 1966. This is still the closest that the conservative parties have come to winning the seat in over a century.

At the 2007 election, Melbourne became a marginal seat for the first time in a century, even as Labor won a decisive victory nationally. Greens candidate Adam Bandt taking second place on a two candidate preferred basis, leaving Labor with 54.71 percent of the vote. On a "traditional" two party preferred basis with the Liberals, Labor finished with 72.27, an increase of 1.13 percentage points.

At the 2010 election however, following the retirement of former member and Minister for Finance and Deregulation Lindsay Tanner, Labor lost Melbourne to the Greens on a large swing, with Bandt far outpolling the Liberals and securing victory over Labor candidate Cath Bowtell. Bandt retained his seat in 2013, 2016 and 2019, with an increase in his primary vote share on each occasion. In 2016 and 2019, he actually pushed Labor into third place.

In 2017, the division had the highest percentage of "Yes" responses in the Australian Marriage Law Postal Survey, with 83.7% of the electorate's respondents to the survey responding "Yes" in favour of same-sex marriage.

Members

Election results

References

External links
 2013 Melbourne profile: AEC
 2013 Melbourne profile: ABC

Electoral divisions of Australia
Constituencies established in 1901
1901 establishments in Australia
Fitzroy, Victoria
Electoral districts and divisions of Greater Melbourne
Division
City of Yarra
East Melbourne, Victoria
Melbourne City Centre